Andrew Robert Watson (born 21 January 1995) is a racing driver from Belfast, Northern Ireland, currently competing in the FIA World Endurance Championship with Gulf Racing and also the GT World Challenge Europe driving for Garage 59. He has been an Aston Martin Racing Junior since 2019. Watson is managed by former F1 driver and 1992 24 Hours of Le Mans winner Mark Blundell.

Racing career

Early career

Watson began his motor racing career at the age of 15, in the Ginetta Junior Ireland Championship, making regular podiums through to 2011. That year, Andrew joined Douglas Motorsport team to race in the final two rounds of the Ginetta Junior Championship at Silverstone.

2012 saw Watson contest the entire Ginetta Junior championship season, again with Douglas Motorsport. The season saw him deliver fifth place in the Championship, achieving six podium places, including second places and his maiden victory, with only two non-finishes out of the twenty-round season.

2013 – Ginetta GT Supercup

Watson's Ginetta Junior team decided to enter the senior competition, the Ginetta GT Supercup, using a Ginetta G55.

At the first meeting of the season at Brands Hatch Indy circuit, Watson qualified second despite having little experience in the much more powerful G55 car. This translated to a seventh-place finish in round 1, followed by an eighth place in round 2, both on the Saturday. Round 3 was held on Sunday an even more impressive finish in fourth place cemented his arrival in the senior ranks.

Success at Donington Park at the second meeting of the year, was not so easy to repeat but Watson did qualify 3rd and managed to get the fastest lap in round 5.

Watson achieved his first podium in the GT Supercup, with a second-place finish in round 7, at the year's third meeting at Thruxton in Hampshire.

At Knockhill, Watson achieved pole position for round 18 (being the meeting's 1st race) on 24 August. This could not be converted to a maiden race win in the GT Supercup owing to him having to serve a drive-through penalty. He eventually finished the race in 10th place.

In round 20 at Knockhill, Watson led the race for 23 of the 24 lap race however he was overtaken for the lead by championship leader Tom Ingram. A last corner overtake saw Matt Nicoll-Jones take second place with Watson gaining holding on to third place.

Watson finished the season in seventh place overall in the standings with 372 points.

2014 – Ginetta GT4 Supercup
For the now renamed 2014 Ginetta GT4 Supercup, Watson stayed with long-term team Douglas Motorsport alongside a new teammate, Harry Woodhead, winner of the 2013 Ginetta Junior Championship.

Success came early, with pole position, fastest lap and a win in the opening round at Brands Hatch, followed by second and third-place finishes in the next two rounds. A further win at Thruxton in round 9 of the series, saw Watson leading the championship with 230 points.

Watson eventually finished the season in fourth place on 640 points.

2015 – British GT Championship
In 2015, Watson made a switch to the British GT Championship driving a McLaren 650S GT3 for Von Ryan Racing as part of the McLaren Young Driver Programme. He is competing in the GT3 class, a step-up from the GT4 class he previously drove in the 2014 Ginetta GT4 Supercup.

Watson scored his best result of the season when he and fellow McLaren GT “Young Driver” Ross Wylie finished seventh in the Silverstone 500 in May 2015, only 20 seconds behind the podium places. The race at Silverstone was preceded by races at Rockingham and Oulton Park. At Oulton Park in April 2015, Watson and his teammate Ross Wiley placed a ninth-place finish in the second race, whilst at Rockingham in May 2015, the team retired from the race on the opening lap following a collision.

Watson also raced in 4 races of the International Open GT Championship, scoring 1 race win and 1 pole position.  In addition, Watson competed in the Sepang 12 hours and secured a class victory.

2016 – Blancpain GT Championship
For 2016, Watson raced in the Blancpain GT Series Endurance Cup with Garage 59 in a McLaren 650S GT3 as a member of the McLaren GT Young Driver Academy.

2016 also saw Watson make his debut at the famous Bathurst 12 hour race, where he finished a credible 9th overall on his first visit to the track.

2017 – Blancpain GT Championship

Watson continued to race in the Blancpain GT Series Endurance Cup and also the Blancpain GT World Challenge Europe again behind the wheel of the McLaren 650s, but this time representing Strakka racing in the 2017 Blancpain GT Series.

2018 – Blancpain GT Championship

Watson remained in the McLaren 650S GT3 racing with Garage 59 in the Blancpain GT Series Endurance Cup. Andrew's 2018 highlights included achieving pole position in the AM class at the Blancpain 24 Hours of Spa and pole position in the PRO Class at Paul Ricard. Watson also achieved an excellent podium position at the 1,000 kilometres of Paul Ricard as Andrew in the #58 Garage 59 McLaren qualified on the front row and led for the majority of the race, before eventually coming home in 3rd place - marking a proud moment in Andrew's career as he achieved his first overall podium finish in the Blancpain GT Series.

Watson also raced in the Blancpain GT World Challenge Europe for 3Y in a BMW M6 GT3, which included race victory in the Silver Class at Brands Hatch.

2019 – Blancpain GT Championship

Watson's 2019 season saw him compete in the European Blancpain GT Endurance Series with Andrew rejoining the Garage 59 team, following their switch to the Aston Martin Vantage GT3's for the 2019 Blancpain campaign.

2019/20 – FIA World Endurance Championship

Andrew Watson was selected to join the Gulf Racing team in the 2019/20 FIA World Endurance Championship. Racing a Porsche 911 RSR, Andrew collected his maiden World Championship podium in Bahrain as the team finished third in the GTE-Am Class. 

Andrew also made his debut in the Aston Martin Vantage GTE as he featured in the FIA World Endurance Championship Rookie Test with Aston Martin Racing.

2020 – Daytona 24 Hours

Andrew Watson made his Daytona 24 Hours debut in January 2020 after securing a late drive with Aston Martin Racing. 

Replacing the injured Paul Dalla Lana, the Northern Irishman joined Pedro Lamy, Mathias Lauda and Ross Gunn in the #98 Aston Martin Vantage GT3.

2020 – Bathurst 12 Hours

On his fourth appearance at the Bathurst 12 Hours, Andrew Watson celebrated a podium finish at the 2020 Bathurst 12 Hour endurance race. 

Watson, along with Garage 59 team-mates Oliver Hart and Roman De Angelis, finished third in the Silver class and 14th overall at Mount Panorama behind the wheel on an Aston Martin Vantage GT3.

Racing record

Career summary

Complete 24 Hours of Le Mans results

References

External links
Offcial Website
 

1995 births
Living people
Sportspeople from Belfast
Racing drivers from Northern Ireland
British GT Championship drivers
International GT Open drivers
24 Hours of Le Mans drivers
Blancpain Endurance Series drivers
24 Hours of Spa drivers
European Le Mans Series drivers
24 Hours of Daytona drivers
WeatherTech SportsCar Championship drivers
FIA World Endurance Championship drivers
Ginetta GT4 Supercup drivers
Ginetta Junior Championship drivers
Aston Martin Racing drivers
Teo Martín Motorsport drivers
Asian Le Mans Series drivers
Strakka Racing drivers
McLaren Racing drivers